Rhabdopterus deceptor is a species of leaf beetle. It is found in North America.

References

Further reading

 

Eumolpinae
Articles created by Qbugbot
Beetles described in 1943
Taxa named by Herbert Spencer Barber
Beetles of North America